The Duchy of Sieradz, also known as the Duchy of Siradia, was one of the territories created during the period of the fragmentation of Poland. It was originally part of the central Seniorate Province, but became separated upon the death of High Duke Władysław III Spindleshanks in 1231, ruled by the rivaling Masovian branch of the Piast dynasty.

In 1299 Duke Władysław I the Elbow-high had to cede Sieradz to King Wenceslaus II of Bohemia, who had also obtained the Seniorate Duchy of Kraków in 1291. Nevertheless, upon the extinction of the Bohemian Přemyslid dynasty in 1306, it was reunited with the Kingdom of Poland as a vassal duchy, and after 1339 incorporated by King Casimir III the Great into the Lands of the Polish Crown as Sieradz Voivodship. Around that time, the term Sieradz Land (terra Siradiensi, ziemia sieradzka) begun replacing the older Duchy nomenclature.

The importance of the territory is reflected in the Latin title of Polish kings: nec non terrarum Cracovie, Sandomirrie, Lancicie, Cuyavie, Syradziensis dux.

Dukes of Sieradz 
 1231–1233 Konrad I of Masovia
 1233–1234 Boleslaus I of Masovia, son
 1234–1247 Konrad I of Masovia, again
 1247–1259 Casimir I of Kuyavia, son, younger brother of Boleslaus
 1259–1260 Siemowit I of Masovia, younger brother of Casimir
 1260–1261 Casimir I of Kuyavia, again
 1261–1288 Leszek II the Black, son of Casimir, also Duke of Kraków from 1279
 1288–1299 Władysław I the Elbow-high, younger half-brother, Duke of Kraków from 1306, King of Poland from 1320
 1299–1305 King Wenceslaus II of Bohemia, Duke of Kraków from 1291, King of Poland from 1300
 1305–1306 King Wenceslaus III of Bohemia, also King of Poland
1306–1327 Władysław I the Elbow-high, again, also Duke of Kraków from 1306, King of Poland from 1320
 1327–1339 Przemysł of Inowrocław, son of Duke Ziemomysł of Kuyavia

References

Duchy of Sieradz
14th-century disestablishments in Poland
History of Poland during the Piast dynasty
Duchies of Poland
States and territories established in 1231
Fiefdoms of Poland